Glen Frederick Hobbie (April 24, 1936 – August 9, 2013) was an American professional baseball player who pitched in the Major Leagues from 1957 to 1964. Born in Witt, Illinois, Hobbie attended and graduated from Witt High School.

All but 13 of Hobbie's 284 games played were spent in the uniform of the Chicago Cubs, for whom he won 16 games in back-to-back seasons (1959–1960). He also lost 20 games in 1960, tying for the National League lead in that category. He was traded to the St. Louis Cardinals for veteran pitcher Lew Burdette on June 2, 1964, but his last MLB appearance came only seven weeks later and Hobbie finished that campaign in minor league baseball.

Overall, he posted a 62–81 won–lost record, 682 strikeouts and a 4.20 earned run average in 284 games pitched (170 as a starter) during his Major League career, with 45 complete games and 11 shutouts; he also earned six saves in relief. He surrendered 1,283 hits and 495 bases on balls.

After retiring from baseball, Hobbie worked as a supervisor for the Roller Derby Association in Litchfield. He died at the age of 77 on August 9, 2013, at a hospital in Springfield, Illinois.

References

External links

Witt Illinois,  Historical Society of Montgomery County Illinois

1936 births
2013 deaths
Baseball players from Illinois
Charleston Senators players
Chicago Cubs players
Dubuque Packers players
Duluth-Superior White Sox players
Jacksonville Suns players
Major League Baseball pitchers
Memphis Chickasaws players
People from Fayette County, Illinois
People from Montgomery County, Illinois
St. Louis Cardinals players
Superior Blues players
Syracuse Chiefs players